The Royal Australian Air Force and its forerunners have won many battle and theatre honours since their formation.

Egypt (1915–17)
Palestine (1917–18)
Western Front (1917–18)
Defence of Britain (1940–45)
Atlantic (1939–45)
Bismark
English Channel and North Sea 1939–45
Tripitz
Baltic (1939–45)
Fortress Europe (1940–44)
France and Germany (1944–45)
Biscay Ports (1940–45)
Ruhr (1940–45)
Berlin (1940–45)
German Ports (1940–45)
Normandy 1944
Walcheren
Rhine
Biscay (1940–45)
S.E. Europe (1942–45)
Egypt and Libya (1940–43)
El Alamein
El Hamma
North Africa (1942–43)
Mediterranean (1940–43)
Sicily 1943
Italy (1943–45)
Anzio and Nettuno
Gustav Line
Gothic Line
Eastern Waters (1941–45)
Arctic (1940–45)
Russia (1941–45)
Syria 1941
Pacific (1941–45)
Malaya (1941–42)
Darwin (1941–44)
Rabaul 1942
Coral Sea
New Guinea (1942–44)
Moresby (1943–44)
Milne Bay
Bismark Sea
New Britain 1943
Markham Valley (1943–44)
Dutch New Guinea 1944
Morotai
South China Sea (1944–45)
Philippines (1944)
Borneo 1945
Malaya (1948–60)
Thai-Malay (1960–66)
Malaysia (Confrontation 1962–66)
Ubon, Thailand (1962–66)
East Timor (1999–2000)
Iraq (2003)

See also
Royal Australian Air Force Memorial, Canberra

Notes

History of the Royal Australian Air Force
Battle honours
Royal Australian Air Force lists